The Zombie King is a British horror comedy film directed by Aidan Belizaire and starring Edward Furlong and Corey Feldman. The film is based on a story by Jennifer Chippindale and Rebecca-Clare Evans.

Plot
Samuel Peters (Edward Furlong), once an ordinary man, dabbles in the laws of voodoo to bring his wife back from the grave. He soon encounters the god of malevolence, Kalfu (Corey Feldman), and makes a pact with him to destroy the underworld and bring chaos to earth. In return, he will become the Zombie King and walk the earth for eternity with his late wife. But as the growing horde of zombies begins to wipe out a countryside town, the government creates a perimeter around the town and employs a shoot-on-sight policy. Trapped within the town, the locals, an unlikely bunch of misfits, must fight for their lives and unite in order to survive.

Cast
 Edward Furlong as Samuel Peters / The Zombie King
 Corey Feldman as Kalfu
 George McCluskey as Ed Wallace
 David McClelland as  Munch
 Michael Gamarano as Boris
 Seb Castang as Simo
 Rebecca-Clare Evans as Danny
 Jennifer Chippindale as Tara
 Jon Campling as Father Lawrence
 Timothy Owen as Neville
 Anabel Barston as Tabitha
 Jane Foufas as Vera
 Leo Horsfield as Scott
 Sebastian Street as Doctor Carter
 Tanya Kararina as Samuel Peters' Wife
 Forbes KB as Gravedigger

Production
The film went into production in the U.K. on 20 November 2011 and was shot over 21 days.

Release
McCluskey originally planned a release for the film in December 2012. In 2013, the film was released on DVD in Germany in April, and Japan in May. In July, Carousel Media announced it was authoring the DVD.

References

External links
 
 

2013 horror films
British comedy horror films
British buddy films
2010s English-language films
Living Dead films
2010s supernatural horror films
British zombie comedy films
2013 comedy horror films
2013 films
British zombie films
2013 comedy films
2010s American films
2010s British films